Yonder Bognie is a stone circle in Aberdeenshire, Scotland. It is located in an agricultural field under private ownership and is a scheduled monument.

References

External links
Megalithic UK
Megalithics.com
The Modern Antiquarian

Geography of Aberdeenshire
Tourist attractions in Aberdeenshire
Stone circles in Aberdeenshire
Megalithic monuments in Scotland
Archaeological sites in Aberdeenshire
History of Aberdeenshire
Scheduled Ancient Monuments in Aberdeenshire